Paulina Gamus is a Venezuelan political commentator and former member of the National Assembly of Venezuela. Gamus is the only Venezuelan Jew to be a member of the National Assembly.

References 

Living people
Venezuelan Jews
Members of the National Assembly (Venezuela)
Jewish Venezuelan politicians
Year of birth missing (living people)